Abbey of Saint Mary of the Valley of Jehosaphat was a Benedictine abbey situated east of the Old City of Jerusalem, founded by Godfrey of Bouillon on the believed site of the Tomb of the Virgin Mary.

History
The abbey was built near a Byzantine church containing the shrine of Mary's Assumption. The first monks of the abbey were from Godfrey's entourage. They managed the Church of Saint Mary, the Grotto of the Agony, and the Church of Gethsemane, all located near the Mount of Olives.

Arnulf of Chocques renovated the church in 1112. Morphia, wife of King Baldwin II, was buried there, starting a precedent whereby queens of Jerusalem were buried apart from their husbands, who were entombed in the Church of the Holy Sepulchre. In 1120, Baldwin II installed his cousin Gilduin of Le Puiset, son of Hugh I of Le Puiset, as abbot. Queen Melisende was also buried there.

See also
Christianity in Israel

References

Further reading
 Post-Classical History, Abbey of Jehosaphat (archive)
 Pringle, Denys, The Churches of the Crusader Kingdom of Jerusalem, Cambridge University Press, London, 1993 (available on Google Books)
 Riley-Smith, Johathan, The First Crusaders, 1095-1131, Cambridge University Press, London, 1997

Shrines to the Virgin Mary
Roman Catholic churches in Jerusalem
Mount of Olives
Church buildings in the Kingdom of Jerusalem
Benedictine monasteries in Israel